Timothy Kroeker (born 25 May 1971 in Chilliwack) is a retired Canadian who specialised in the 110 metres hurdles. He represented his country at the 1996 Summer Olympics, as well two outdoor and three indoor World Championships.

His personal bests are 13.57 seconds in the 110 meters hurdles (+1.2 m/s, Flagstaff 1994) and 7.81 seconds in the 60 metres hurdles (Toronto 1993).
Tim Kroeker has three children, Ella Kroeker is the youngest, Karianne Kroeker is the middle child, and Justine Kroeker is the oldest.

Competition record

References

External links
 
 
 
 
 
 

1971 births
Living people
People from Chilliwack
Canadian male hurdlers
Olympic track and field athletes of Canada
Athletes (track and field) at the 1991 Pan American Games
Athletes (track and field) at the 1996 Summer Olympics
Commonwealth Games competitors for Canada
Athletes (track and field) at the 1994 Commonwealth Games
World Athletics Championships athletes for Canada
Pan American Games track and field athletes for Canada